Gmina Strumień is an urban-rural gmina (administrative district) in Cieszyn County, Silesian Voivodeship, in southern Poland, in the historical region of Cieszyn Silesia. Its seat is the town of Strumień.

Villages
Apart from the town of Strumień, Gmina Strumień contains the villages and settlements of Bąków, Drogomyśl, Pruchna, Zabłocie and Zbytków.

Neighbouring gminas
Gmina Strumień is bordered by the gminas of Chybie, Dębowiec, Goczałkowice-Zdrój, Hażlach, Pawłowice, Pszczyna, Skoczów and Zebrzydowice.

Twin towns – sister cities

Gmina Strumień is twinned with:

 Dolní Domaslavice, Czech Republic
 Dolný Hričov, Slovakia
 Krasňany, Slovakia
 Petřvald, Czech Republic
 Šenov, Czech Republic
 Súľov-Hradná, Slovakia

References

External links
  Official website

Strumien
Cieszyn County
Cieszyn Silesia